The Oath may refer to:

Books
  The Oath (Wiesel novel), a 1973 novel by Elie Wiesel
 The Oath (Peretti novel), a 1995 novel by Frank E. Peretti
 The Oath: The Obama White House and the Supreme Court, a 2012 book by Jeffrey Toobin

Film and TV

Films
 The Oath (1921 American film), by Raoul Walsh and starring Miriam Cooper
 The Oath (1921 British film), a silent British film by Fred Paul
 The Oath (2005 film), a short film by Nathan Collett 
 The Oath (2010 film), a documentary by Laura Poitras
 The Oath (2016 film), an Icelandic film
 The Oath (2018 film), a black comedy by Ike Barinholtz

Television
 "The Oath" (CSI episode)
 "The Oath" (Battlestar Galactica)
 The Oath (American TV series), a 2018 Crackle series
 The Oath (Singaporean TV series), a Singaporean series
 The Walking Dead: The Oath, a three-part web series between seasons three and four of the TV series The Walking Dead
 "The Oath" (The Americans), the twelfth episode of the first season of the television series The Americans

Music
 "The Oath", a song by Street Sweeper Social Club on the album Street Sweeper Social Club
 "The Oath", a song by Mercyful Fate on the album Don't Break the Oath
 "The Oath", a song by Kiss on the album Music from "The Elder"
 "The Oath", a song by Manowar from Sign of the Hammer
 "The Oath", a song by KXNG CROOKED on the album Good vs. Evil

Other
 The Oath (video game), a shoot 'em up video game

See also
 Oath (disambiguation)